Emig Mansion is a historic home located at Emigsville, Manchester Township, York County, Pennsylvania, US. It was built in about 1810 and is a 2½-story, Georgian-style brick dwelling. It measures about 66 feet long by 30 feet wide. It is five bays wide and two bays deep and has a slate-covered gable roof. A large wing was added in about 1885. The wing is four bays by two bays and integral porches. The house was remodeled in the early-20th century to add a large two-story bay window and porches. The front porch has Doric order columns and the porch on the south facade is semi-circular.

The house is open as a bed and breakfast and meeting center.

It was added to the National Register of Historic Places in 1984.

References

External links
Emig Mansion website

Bed and breakfasts in Pennsylvania
Houses on the National Register of Historic Places in Pennsylvania
Georgian architecture in Pennsylvania
Houses completed in 1850
Houses in York County, Pennsylvania
National Register of Historic Places in York County, Pennsylvania